The Embassy of the Sultanate of Oman in Tokyo, Japan is the Sultanate of Oman's diplomatic mission to Japan since 1979. The Ambassador is HE Dr. Mohamed Said Al Busaidi, who will also be Oman's non-resident Ambassador to Australia and New Zealand. The Embassy is located at 4-2-17 Hiroo, Shibuya-ku, Tokyo 150-0012, Japan.

References

External links
 Oman Embassy, Japan Official Website
 Oman Ministry of Foreign Affairs
  
  

Tokyo
Oman
Government agencies established in 1979
Japan–Oman relations